Mr. Pickles is an American adult animated sitcom created by Will Carsola and Dave Stewart for Adult Swim. The series revolves around the Goodman family, especially their 6-year-old son named Tommy and the family's border collie dog, the satanic Mr. Pickles. The series aired from September 21, 2014 to November 18, 2019.

The first episode of season 4 was a surprise series finale, replacing the show with a new spin-off series titled Momma Named Me Sheriff.

Plot
In the small, old-fashioned community of Old Town, the Goodman family and their innocent and dimwitted 6-year-old son Tommy have a satanic border collie dog named Mr. Pickles. The two spend their days romping around Old Town, while unknown to Tommy, the family or anyone Mr. Pickles tolerates – except for Tommy's grandfather – Mr. Pickles secretly slips away to kill and mutilate his countless victims. Mr. Pickles will often reassemble and resurrect his victims which then reside in his underground lair and do his bidding. Through his evil, murderous rampage against those that threaten his boy, get in his way or annoy him, Mr. Pickles brings some order to Old Town, which is otherwise riddled with crime in the face of the dimwitted sheriff.

Characters

 Dave Stewart as Mr. Pickles, Floyd, Linda, and Deer Hunter #2
 Kaitlyn Robrock as Tommy Goodman, Candy
 Brooke Shields as Beverly Goodman
 Jay Johnston as Stanley Goodman
 Frank Collison as Henry Gobbleblobber, Mr. Bojenkins (Season 1-2)
 Will Carsola as Sheriff, Boss, and Deer Hunter #1
 Alex Désert as Mr. Bojenkins (Season 3, finale)

Additional voices

 Joey Lauren Adams as The Girl
 Pamela Adlon as Mary
 Bob Bergen as Crime Man
 Sean Conroy
 Andy Daly as Doctor
 Colton Dunn as Rich Snob, Darrel
 John Ennis
 Dave Foley as Scientist
 Vivica A. Fox as Poison
 Brett Gelman as Cheeseman
 Barbara Goodson as Agnes Gobbleblobber/Steve
 Elaine Hendrix as Lorena
 Carrie Keranen as Lisa
 Christine Lakin as Blonde Girl
 Michelle León

 Tom Kenny as Sidekick Boy
 Candi Milo as Butt-Faced Woman
 Tracy Morgan as Skids
 Iggy Pop as Texas Red
 Andy Richter
 Jacod Young
 Mark Rivers
 Henry Rollins as Government Agent Commander
 Stephen Root as Mr. Montgomery
 Amy Sedaris as Sally
 Steve-O as Pizza Delivery Guy
 Frank Vincent as Jon Gabagooli
 John Waters as Dr. Kelton
 "Weird Al" Yankovic as Vegan Member
 Rob Zombie as Vegan Cult Leader

Production
The series, which is animated using Adobe Flash, was created by Will Carsola and Dave Stewart – known for Funny or Die Presents  – and executive-produced by Will Carsola, Dave Stewart, and Michael J. Rizzo. The series was one of several shows pitched to Adult Swim, according to the creators, who also operate under the name "Day by Day". Stewart recalled promoting it as a "one-line sentence", while Carsola remembered that it derived from a "write-off" session, where the two present ideas to each other in the form of scribbles for their amusement. Carsola explained that ideas in this process are released from the pressure "of them being good", occasionally finding "one that sticks". They later explained at the 2014 San Diego Comic-Con International that the idea was based on Lassie, but has become "more of its own thing since then."

Stewart's own female Australian Cattle Dog served as inspiration for the animators on the character of Mr. Pickles. Stewart even pointed out similarities between her and the main character, and jokingly called her "Ms. Pickles". Animation director Mike L. Mayfield recorded Stewart's dog playing around on video, with animators using the resulting footage as a basis for the character's movements. Its setting is roughly based on Richmond, Virginia, where the creators started out in entertainment before moving to Los Angeles. The creators are given creative freedom by the network, with Stewart explaining the notes received by them as "minimal", much to their surprise. The creators observed some inconsistencies as to what is considered unacceptable, but try not to question it and compromise instead.

Elaborating on its 11-minute running time, Carsola described it as a 22-minute show "squished" into a quarter-hour. Among the voices for the characters include Brooke Shields, Frank Collison, Jay Johnston and Carsola and Stewart themselves. Shields' role in the series came after looking at the creator's work for Funny or Die and obtaining the script for Mr. Pickles. According to Carsola, the two were dubious over her interest in the series, but after being cast she provided lines in a recording booth in New York City while the creators supervised over Skype.

Episodes

Broadcast and reception
The series was picked up for ten quarter-hour episodes for its first season, premiering on the network on September 21, 2014 following the ninth-season premiere of Squidbillies. In July 2013, the pilot episode was released online as part of a presentation of in-development shows for the network, partnered with KFC; viewers could vote for their favorite pilot, with the winner being broadcast on August 26, 2013. The series lost to Übermansion, a Stoopid Buddy Stoodios production, although the presentation as a whole won an Internet Advertising Campaign Award in 2014 for "Best TV Integrated Ad Campaign". The pilot was later published on the network's website on January 23, 2014, and on YouTube on March 10 of the same year, becoming viral with over 700,000 views after roughly a month later. A second season was mentioned at the 2014 Comic-Con.

Aaron Simpson of Cold Hard Flash called the series an amalgamation of Lassie and Superjail!, while observing some social commentary "to ensure this is more than just a multi-episodic sketch." Mike Hale of The New York Times labeled it "the less tasteful but more mainstream" counterpart to Tim & Eric's Bedtime Stories, another addition to the network. He wrote that the show was "more grisly than funny," but predicted it to have a cult following and that Shields' voice would add "surreal-pop-culture cachet".

In Australia, the series premiered on August 3, 2015 on The Comedy Channel, and then moved to the free to air Adult Swim block on 9Go!

In Canada, the series premiered on April 1, 2019 on Adult Swim.

In April 2017, a trailer was released promoting the season 3 premiere to air in fall 2017; however, this was later pushed back, for unknown reasons, to the following year.  The first episode of season three premiered on February 26, 2018. The show was renewed for a fourth season, before the third one even premiered.

References

External links
 
 

2010s American adult animated television series
2010s American black comedy television series
2010s American sitcoms
2010s American surreal comedy television series
2013 American television series debuts
2019 American television series endings
American adult animated comedy television series
American adult animated horror television series
American animated sitcoms
American flash adult animated television series
English-language television shows
Adult Swim original programming
Television series by Williams Street
Animated television series about children
Animated television series about dogs
Animated television series about dysfunctional families
Satanism in popular culture